Siroda Assembly constituency is one of the 40 Goa Legislative Assembly constituencies of the state of Goa in southern India. Siroda is also one of the 20 constituencies falling under the South Goa Lok Sabha constituency. Siroda borders 8 other constituencies; most for any constituency in Goa.

Members of Legislative Assembly

Election results

2022 result

2017

2012

2007

See also
 List of constituencies of the Goa Legislative Assembly
 North Goa district

References

Footnotes

External links
 

North Goa district
Assembly constituencies of Goa